Nangegadda is a village in Krishna district of Indian state of Andhra Pradesh. It is located in Nagayalanka mandal of Machilipatnam revenue division.

References 

Villages in Krishna district